Gisle Midttun (1881–1940) was a Norwegian cultural historian and museologist. He was born in Kvinnherad, and was a brother of philologist Olav Midttun. Midttun was assigned with the Norwegian Museum of Cultural History from 1910. He was a co-editor of the multi-volume series Norske bygder, where he also published several of his scientific works.

References

1881 births
1940 deaths
People from Kvinnherad
20th-century Norwegian historians
Cultural historians